The Siau scops owl (Otus siaoensis) is a critically endangered owl species. They live on Siau Island, north of Sulawesi, Indonesia and are (were) forest dwellers. The species is only known from a single holotype from 1866 although there have been some local reports in recent years. Even so, their habitat is being lost to excessive logging of the forest on the island and there would be very few if any individuals left.  
The taxonomic arrangement for this owl has not been fully worked out.  While recognized as a distinct species by the IOC, others consider it as a subspecies of either the Sulawesi scops owl or Moluccan scops owl.

References

External links 
 BirdLife Species Factsheet
 Red Data Book

Otus (bird)
Endemic birds of Sulawesi
Critically endangered fauna of Asia
Birds described in 1873
Taxa named by Hermann Schlegel
Species known from a single specimen